Wend von Wietersheim (18 April 1900 – 19 September 1975) was a German general in the Wehrmacht during World War II. He was a recipient of the Knight's Cross of the Iron Cross with Oak Leaves and Swords of Nazi Germany.

Career
Wietersheim was born in 1900 into a family of the Chamberlain Walter von Wietersheim (1863–1919). Wietersheim served in World War I with the 4th (1st Silesian) Hussars "von Schill" He joined the Reichswehr of the Weimar Republic, serving in the cavalry. In 1938 he transferred to the Panzer (tank) force as an adjutant with the 3rd Panzer Division. With this unit he participated in the German invasion of Poland. Wietersheim took command of a motorcycle infantry battalion of the 1st Panzer Division. He led this battalion in the Battle of France.

Wietersheim was appointed commander of a rifle regiment of the 1st Panzer-Division on 20 July 1941, with which he took part in the invasion of the Soviet Union, Operation Barbarossa. The 1st Panzer Division was subordinated to Panzer Group 4 under the command of General Erich Hoepner operating on the northern sector of the Eastern Front. In late 1944, Wietersheim was in the south of France, commanding the 11th Panzer Division as it faced Allied amphibious landings near Toulon and Nice. Wietersheim surrendered to the US 90th Infantry Division in May 1945, in Czechoslovakia near the border with Bavaria.

Awards
 Iron Cross (1914) 2nd Class (5 April 1919)
 Clasp to the Iron Cross (1939) 2nd Class (1 October 1939)
 Iron Cross (1939) 1st Class (20 May 1940)
 Panzer Badge in Silver
 Wound Badge in Black
 German Cross in Gold on 24 December 1941 as Oberstleutnant in Kradschützen-Bataillon 1
 Knight's Cross of the Iron Cross with Oak Leaves and Swords
 Knight's Cross on 10 February 1942 as Oberstleutnant and commander of Schützen-Regiment 113
 176th Oak Leaves on 12 January 1943 as Oberst and commander of Panzergrenadier-Regiment 113
 58th Swords on 26 March 1944 as Generalmajor and commander of the 11. Panzer-Division

See also
 Gustav Anton von Wietersheim
 Walter von Wietersheim

References

Citations

Bibliography

 
 
 
 
 

1900 births
1975 deaths
People from Lwówek Śląski
People from the Province of Silesia
German Army personnel of World War I
Prussian Army personnel
Lieutenant generals of the German Army (Wehrmacht)
Recipients of the Gold German Cross
Recipients of the Knight's Cross of the Iron Cross with Oak Leaves and Swords
Recipients of the clasp to the Iron Cross, 2nd class
Reichswehr personnel